Argillochelys is an extinct genus of sea turtle from the middle to lower Eocene in what is now Britain. It was first named by Lydekker in 1889.

A species, A. africana, was found in Morocco, and described in 2008 by Tong & Hirayama.

References

External links
 Argillochelys at the Paleobiology Database
 www.ppne.co.uk

Eocene turtles
Chelonioidea
Eocene reptiles of Europe
Eocene reptiles of Africa
Prehistoric turtle genera
Taxa named by Richard Lydekker
Fossil taxa described in 1889